"Heavy lies the crown..." is a misquote of the line "Uneasy lies the head that wears a crown", from Shakespeare's play  Henry IV, Part 2.

Heavy Lies the Crown may also refer to:

Music

Albums

 Heavy Lies the Crown, a 2015 album by rock band Godsized
 Heavy Lies the Crown (album), a 2014 album by underground hip-hop collective Army of the Pharaohs
 Heavy Lies the Crown, a 2010 album by the funk jazz band Zen Robbi
 Heavy Lies the Crown, a 2007 album by metalcore band Full Blown Chaos

Songs
 "Heavy Lies the Crown", a song by Doomriders from the album Darkness Come Alive
 "Heavy Lies the Crown", a song by Draconian from the album Sovran
 "Heavy Lies the Crown", a song by In Fear and Faith from the album Imperial
 "Heavy Lies the Crown", a song by A Loss for Words
 "Heavy Lies the Crown", a song by King 810 from the album La Petite Mort or a Conversation with God
 "Heavy Lies the Crown", a song by Machine Head from the album Catharsis
 "Heavy Lies the Crown", a song by Orange Goblin
 "Heavy Lies the Crown", a song by The Scene Aesthetic from their self-titled album
 "Heavy Lies the Crown", a song by The Showdown from the album Blood in the Gears
 "Heavy Lies the Crown", a song by Solution .45

Other uses
 "Heavy Lies the Crown", an episode of the television series The 100

See also
Heavy Is the Head (disambiguation), another variation of the line

Heavy Is the Crown, a song by Daughtry from the album Dearly Beloved